Dog Bite Dog  is a 2006 Hong Kong action crime thriller film directed by Soi Cheang and starring Edison Chen as a brutal Cambodian assassin, desperately trying to evade the police, led by Sam Lee, after completing an assignment in Hong Kong. The film was released in Hong Kong cinemas on 17 August 2006.

Plot
A young Cambodian man who has been trained to fight for money in his country is hired to kill someone in Hong Kong. He performs the hit and then flees from Hong Kong police, who are wrestling with internal problems of a model cop and his son, who is also on the force and who was told by his dad not to become a police officer. The father goes into a coma after being shot, and internal affairs suspects him of dealing drugs on the side.

The assassin then befriends a young girl who is raped and abused by her father. They both plan to get back on a ship to Cambodia but have to get past Hong Kong police, who do everything they can to catch him.

Reception
G4s Asian Underground named Dog Bite Dog a bitter sweet action drama that touched on many emotional levels, but it is not for everyone.

Festivals
The film played later that year at the Tokyo International Film Festival. In 2007, the film played at the Deauville Asian Film Festival, the Amsterdam Fantastic Film Festival, the New York Asian Film Festival, the Fantasy Film Fest (Germany) and the Fantasia Festival in Montreal.

Distribution
North American rights to the film were purchased by The Weinstein Company for its Dragon Dynasty DVD line, which released the film on DVD on 23 October 2007.

Awards and nominations

References

External links

 HK cinemagic entry

2006 films
2006 action thriller films
2000s crime action films
2006 crime thriller films
2006 martial arts films
Hong Kong action thriller films
Hong Kong crime thriller films
Hong Kong martial arts films
Police detective films
Films directed by Cheang Pou-soi
Films about contract killing
Films set in Hong Kong
Films shot in Hong Kong
Hong Kong crime action films
2000s Hong Kong films